Sixth-seeded Manuel Santana defeated Nicola Pietrangeli 4–6, 6–1, 3–6, 6–0, 6–2 in the final to win the men's singles tennis title at the 1961 French Championships.

Seeds
The seeded players are listed below. Manuel Santana is the champion; others show the round in which they were eliminated.

  Nicola Pietrangeli (final)
  Rod Laver (semifinals)
  Roy Emerson (quarterfinals)
  Jan-Erik Lundqvist (semifinals)
  Pierre Darmon (third round)
  Manuel Santana (champion)
  Ron Holmberg (quarterfinals)
  Robert Wilson (fourth round)
  Robert Mark (second round)
  Jacques Brichant (fourth round)
  Ulf Schmidt (first round)
  Bob Hewitt (fourth round)
  Mario Llamas (fourth round)
  Orlando Sirola (third round)
  Ronald Barnes (fourth round)
  Lew Gerrard (second round)

Draw

Key
 Q = Qualifier
 WC = Wild card
 LL = Lucky loser
 r = Retired

Finals

Earlier rounds

Section 1

Section 2

Section 3

Section 4

Section 5

Section 6

Section 7

Section 8

External links
   on the French Open website

1961
1961 in French tennis